Kjose Station is a former railway station on the Vestfold Line in the village of Kjose in Larvik, Norway. The station was served by regional trains operated by the Norwegian State Railways and opened as part of the Vestfold Line in 1882.

External links
Jernbaneverket's entry on Kjose station 

Railway stations in Larvik
Railway stations on the Vestfold Line
Railway stations opened in 1882
1882 establishments in Norway